The Greenhorn Mountain Wilderness is a U.S. Wilderness Area located northwest of Walsenburg, Colorado in the San Isabel and Pike National Forests. The wilderness area includes the summit of Greenhorn Mountain, the highest point in the Wet Mountains of Colorado.

References

Wilderness areas of Colorado
Protected areas established in 1993
Protected areas of Huerfano County, Colorado
Protected areas of Pueblo County, Colorado
San Isabel National Forest
Pike National Forest
1993 establishments in Colorado